John Charles Waldron (August 24, 1900 – June 4, 1942) was a United States Navy aviator who led a squadron of torpedo bombers in World War II. He was among the twenty-nine men in his squadron who perished in the Battle of Midway.

Birth and early life
Waldron was born on August 24, 1900 at Fort Pierre, South Dakota, son of rancher Charles Westbrook Waldron and Jane Van Metre grandson of lawyer and probate Judge George Prentiss Waldron, and a sixth great nephew of Richard Waldron. He was of colonial New Hampshire families on his father's side, and of Oglala Lakota and Southerner background on his mother's side. His family immigrated to Canada when he was a child and homesteaded near Lashburn, Saskatchewan where he spent his youth before returning to the USA. In the midst of his armed forces career he married Adelaide Wentworth and had two daughters. He studied law and was admitted to the bar, but never practiced.

Naval aviation training and shore duty
He received an appointment as midshipman from his home state on June 16, 1920 and graduated with the United States Naval Academy Class of 1924. Following his initial sea duty aboard Seattle (CA-11), Waldron went to Naval Air Station Pensacola, Florida, where he received his wings in the summer of 1927. Over the ensuing months, Waldron flew with torpedo squadrons (VT-1S and VT-9S and received his promotion to lieutenant, junior grade, on February 16, 1928. He served at the Naval Academy from May 24 to September 13, 1929, where he instructed midshipmen in the field of aviation. Then, after duty as an instructor at the NAS Pensacola, between October 1929 and June 1931, Waldron went to sea again, this time with Scouting Squadron 3B (VS-3B), based aboard Lexington (CV-2), reporting for duty on July 1, 1931.

Waldron flew observation aircraft off Colorado (BB-45), before he joined Patrol Squadron 1B (VP-1B), Battle Force, for a brief period in late 1936. Subsequently flying from Saratoga (CV-3) with Fighting Squadron 3 (VF-3) until the early summer of 1939, he reported back to NAS Pensacola, for further instructor's duty on June 27, 1939. Waldron then served three successive tours of shore duty, all involving flying, at the Naval Proving Ground, Dahlgren, Va.; the Bureau of Ordnance, Washington, D.C.; and finally in the 3rd Naval District, where he was appointed naval inspector of ordnance at the plant of Carl L. Norden, Inc., in New York City—makers of the famed Norden bombsight. Detached from that duty in the summer of 1941, Lieutenant Commmader Waldron took command of the newly formed Torpedo Squadron 8 (VT-8), part of the embryonic air group being assembled for the new fleet carrier Hornet (CV-8) at Newport News, Virginia. The Pearl Harbor attack, though, meant that his training of his men had to be intensive.

At Midway

"Torpedo 8" did not get a chance to practice its trade, however, until nearly 10 months after it had been commissioned at Norfolk. Too late to take part in the Battle of the Coral Sea, VT-8 would receive its brutal baptism of fire at the turning point of the Pacific War—the Battle of Midway. In the days preceding that battle, VT-8 led a relaxed existence on board the carrier as she steamed toward "Point Luck" from Pearl Harbor in the first few days of June 1942. Finally, on the eve of battle, Commander Waldron called his men together and distributed a mimeographed plan of attack. He concluded by saying that if worst came to worst, he wanted each man to do his utmost to destroy the enemy. "If there is only one plane left to make a final run-in," he told his men, "I want that man to go in and get a hit. May God be with us all. Good luck, happy landings, and give 'em hell."

The next day, June 4, the 15 Douglas TBD-1 Devastators of VT-8 launched from Hornets flight deck in search of the enemy. Before takeoff, LCDR Waldron had a dispute with the Hornet's Commander, Air Group, Stanhope C. Ring, and Hornet CO Marc Mitscher about where the Japanese carriers would be found. Despite having a contact report showing the Japanese southwest of Hornet, Mitscher and Ring ordered the flight to take a course due west, in the hopes of spotting a possible trailing group of carriers. Waldron argued for a course based on the contact report, but was overruled. Once in the air, Waldron attempted to take control of the Hornet strike group by radio. Failing that, he soon split his squadron off and led his unit directly to the Japanese carrier group. Waldron, leading the first carrier planes to approach the Japanese carriers (somewhat after 9:00AM local time, over an hour before the American dive bombers would arrive), was grimly aware of the lack of fighter protection, but true to his plan of attack committed Torpedo 8 to battle. Without fighter escort, underpowered, with limited defensive armament, and forced by the unreliability of their own torpedoes to fly low and slow directly at their targets, the Hornet torpedo planes received the undivided attention of the enemy's combat air patrol of Mitsubishi Zero fighters. All 15 planes were shot down. Of the 30 men who set out that morning, only one—Ensign George H. Gay, Jr., USNR—survived. Their sacrifice, however, had not been in vain. Torpedo 8 had forced the Japanese carriers to maneuver radically, delaying the launching of the planned strike against the American carriers. After further separate attacks by the remaining two torpedo squadrons over the next hour, Japanese fighter cover and air defense coordination had become focused on low-altitude defense. The dive bombers fatally damaged three of the four Japanese carriers, changing the course of the battle.

Torpedo 8 earned the Presidential Unit Citation. Lieutenant Commander Waldron received the Navy Cross posthumously, as well as a share of the unit citation.  Waldron was portrayed  by actor Glenn Corbett in the 1976 film Midway.

Namesake
The USS Waldron (DD-699), an Allen M. Sumner-class destroyer, was named in his honor.
 Naval Auxiliary Air Station Waldron Field, part of the NAS Corpus Christi, Texas complex, was named in his honor.  Closed in the 1950s, NAAS Waldron Field was later reactivated in the early 1960s as an outlying field renamed OLF Waldron Field' in support of Student Naval Aviator primary flight training operations at NAS Corpus Christi, a role it continues to have today.

Camp Waldron of the Farragut Naval Training Station on Lake Pend Oreille in northern Idaho was named in honor of LtCdr Waldron.  The camp, designed to house and train 5,000 naval recruits at a time, opened on 8 November 1942.

The very popular "Waldron Deck" parking structure, named in the Lieutenant's honor, set just south of Soldier Field in Chicago, is the premier location for Bears fans to gather for tailgating on game day.
John C. Waldron Bridge (renamed in his honor in 2002) across the Missouri River between Pierre and Fort Pierre, SD.

Ancestry

References

External links

 history.navy.mil: DANFS biography of John Waldron 
 biography of John Waldron emphasizing early life and maternal ancestry
 torpedoeight.com including film and references to John Waldron

1900 births
1942 deaths
United States Navy officers
Battle of Midway
Recipients of the Navy Cross (United States)
United States Navy personnel killed in World War II
People from Fort Pierre, South Dakota
United States Navy bomber pilots of World War II